Draymond Washington (born July 17, 1990) is an American former soccer player who played for Tampa Bay Rowdies in the North American Soccer League.

Career

College and Amateur
Washington spent his college career at George Mason University.  He started his first two seasons as a forward before transitioning to defender his junior year.  Washington made a total of 64 appearances finished with seven goals and seven assists.

Washington also spent the 2011 season with Real Maryland Monarchs in the USL Premier Development League.

Professional
On March 23, 2012, Washington signed a professional contract with NASL club Tampa Bay Rowdies.  Two months later, Washington made his debut in a 3-2 win over the Atlanta Silverbacks.

On December 19, 2013, Tampa Bay declined Washington's contract option and Washington became a free agent.

Personal life 
After playing for the Rowdies for 2 years, Washington relocated to Chicago in 2018 and now works as a Financial adviser for Merrill.

References

External links
 North American Soccer League profile
 George Mason University bio

1990 births
Living people
American soccer players
George Mason Patriots men's soccer players
Real Maryland F.C. players
Tampa Bay Rowdies players
USL League Two players
North American Soccer League players
Association football defenders